Pfarrkirchen bei Bad Hall is a municipality in the district of Steyr-Land in the Austrian state of Upper Austria.

Geography
Pfarrkirchen lies in the Traunviertel. About 10 percent of the municipality is forest, and 77 percent is farmland.

References

Cities and towns in Steyr-Land District